Richie Grant may refer to:

 Richie Grant (soccer), American soccer coach and former soccer player
 Richie Grant (American football) (born 1997), American football safety

See also
 Richard Grant (disambiguation)